Jeremy Charles Sivits (December 10, 1979 – January 16, 2022) was a United States Army reservist. He was one of several soldiers charged and convicted by the U.S. Army in connection with the 2003–2004 Abu Ghraib prisoner abuse scandal in Baghdad, Iraq, during and after the 2003 invasion of Iraq. Sivits was a member of the 372nd Military Police Company during this time.

Sivits took photographs at the Abu Ghraib prison which became notorious after being aired on 60 Minutes II. His father, Daniel Sivits, a former serviceman, said that he was trained as a mechanic, not a prison guard, and that he "was just doing what he was told to do." Sivits was the first soldier convicted in connection with the Abu Ghraib incidents. 

He died from COVID-19 in Roaring Spring, Pennsylvania, on January 16, 2022, at age 42, during the COVID-19 pandemic in Pennsylvania.

Court martial
On May 5, 2004, Sivits was charged under Uniform Code of Military Justice with conspiracy to maltreat detainees, maltreatment of detainees, and dereliction of duty for negligently failing to protect detainees from abuse, cruelty and maltreatment.  His special court-martial was held on May 19, 2004, in Baghdad.

Sivits pleaded guilty and testified against some of his fellow soldiers. Sivits' testimony included reporting seeing Charles Graner punching a naked detainee "with a closed fist so hard in the temple that it knocked the detainee unconscious." Sivits also testified seeing Lynndie England stomping on the feet and hands of detainees with her boots. Human Rights Watch and other human rights groups were not permitted to attend the trial.

The court martial sentenced Sivits to the maximum sentence, one year of confinement, in addition to being discharged for bad conduct and demoted from specialist to private.

In a 2018 interview, he had shown remorse for his actions, claiming "to hate himself".

See also
 Megan Ambuhl
 Ivan Frederick
 Sabrina Harman
 Standard Operating Procedure (film)

References

1979 births
2022 deaths
Deaths from the COVID-19 pandemic in Pennsylvania
American male criminals
United States Army personnel of the Iraq War
Photography in Iraq
United States Army personnel who were court-martialed
United States Army soldiers
United States military personnel at the Abu Ghraib prison
American people convicted of torture
American people convicted of assault
American people convicted of war crimes
People from Jonesboro, Arkansas
Military personnel from Arkansas